Corney is a surname. Notable people with the surname include:

 Ed Corney (1933–2019), American bodybuilder
 Emma Corney (born 2004), English cricketer
 Liberto Corney (1905–1955), Uruguayan boxer
 Peter Corney (died 1835), English sailor and explorer